SPLA may refer to:

 Sahrawi People's Liberation Army, the army of the Sahrawi Arab Democratic Republic, previously the armed branch of the Polisario Front
 Socialist Propaganda League of America, former group within the ranks of the Socialist Party of America, 1915–1919 
 South Sudan People's Defense Forces, formerly Sudan People's Liberation Army
 SPLA-Nasir and SPLA-United, a Sudanese breakaway faction formed in 1991
 Services Provider License Agreement, created by Microsoft to allow service providers to host software services for their customers

See also
 Spla/ryanodine receptor domain and socs box containing 3, a protein encoded by the SPSB3 gene